Manish Sharma may refer to:

 Manish Sharma (cricketer, born 1981), Indian cricketer who plays for the Chandigarh Lions
 Manish Sharma (cricketer, born 1996), Indian cricketer